The 1891 Brooklyn Grooms (the name was shortened from "Bridegrooms" this season) started the year with real estate mogul George Chauncey purchasing a controlling interest in the ballclub to join Ferdinand Abell and Charles Byrne in the ownership group. The former owner of the Brooklyn Ward's Wonders in the now defunct Players' League, Chauncey organized a merger of his team with the Grooms, forcing the firing of manager Bill McGunnigle (despite his winning two league championships) and replacing him with former Wonders manager and shortstop, John Montgomery Ward. The new owner also thought the team could generate larger revenue from a bigger stadium, so they decided to move the team to his stadium, Eastern Park. Games would be split between the new facility and old Washington Park during the 1891 season and the team would move full-time in 1892.  With all the turmoil, the team fell back into the pack, finishing the season in sixth place.

Regular season

Season standings

Record vs. opponents

Roster

Player stats

Batting

Starters by position 
Note: Pos = Position; G = Games played; AB = At bats; R = Runs; H = Hits; Avg. = Batting average; HR = Home runs; RBI = Runs batted in; SB = Stolen bases

Other batters 
Note: G = Games played; AB = At bats; R = Runs; H = Hits; Avg. = Batting average; HR = Home runs; RBI = Runs batted in; SB = Stolen bases

Pitching

Starting pitchers 
Note: G = Games pitched; IP = Innings pitched; W = Wins; L = Losses; ERA = Earned run average; BB = Bases on balls; SO = Strikeouts; CG = Complete games

Notes

References 
Baseball-Reference season page
Baseball Almanac season page

External links 
Brooklyn Dodgers reference site
Acme Dodgers page 
Retrosheet

Los Angeles Dodgers seasons
Brooklyn Grooms season
Brooklyn
19th century in Brooklyn
Brownsville, Brooklyn
Park Slope